The lexical definition of a term, also known as the dictionary definition, is the definition closely matching the meaning of the term in common usage. As its other name implies, this is the sort of definition one is likely to find in the dictionary. A lexical definition is usually the type expected from a request for definition, and it is generally expected that such a definition will be stated as simply as possible in order to convey information to the widest audience. 

Note that a lexical definition is descriptive, reporting actual usage within speakers of a language, and changes with changing usage of the term, rather than prescriptive, which would be to stick with a version regarded as "correct", regardless of drift in accepted meaning. They tend to be inclusive, attempting to capture everything the term is used to refer to, and as such are often too vague for many purposes. 

When the breadth or vagueness of a lexical definition is unacceptable, a precising definition or a stipulative definition is often used. 

Words can be classified as lexical or nonlexical. Lexical words are those that have independent meaning (such as a Noun (N), verb (V), adjective (A), adverb (Adv), or preposition (P).

The definition which reports the meaning of a word or a phrase as it is actually used by people is called a lexical definition. Meanings of words given in a dictionary are lexical definitions. As a word may have more than one meaning, it may also have more than one lexical definition.

See also
 Circular definition
 Definition
 Theoretical definition

Logic
Definition